Andreas Crismanto Ado (born 15 March 1997) is an Indonesian professional footballer who plays as a forward.

Club career

PS Bengkulu
He was signed for PS Bengkulu to play in Liga 2 in the 2017 season. He made 7 league appearances and scored 4 goals for PS Bengkulu.

Persiwa Wamena
In 2018, Andreas Ado signed a one-year contract with Indonesian Liga 2 club Persiwa Wamena. He made 10 league appearances and scored 2 goals for Persiwa Wamena.

PSIS Semarang
He was signed for PSIS Semarang to play in Liga 1. Ado made his debut on 18 October 2019 in a match against Persela Lamongan. On 15 October 2021, Ado scored his first goal for PSIS against Persik Kediri in the 21st minute at the Manahan Stadium, Surakarta.

Career statistics

Club

References

External links
 Andreas Ado at Soccerway

1997 births
Living people
Indonesian footballers
Liga 2 (Indonesia) players
Liga 1 (Indonesia) players
Persiwa Wamena players
PSIS Semarang players
Association football forwards
Sportspeople from Jakarta